Samuel Richard Darnold (born June 5, 1997) is an American football quarterback for the San Francisco 49ers of the National Football League (NFL). He played college football at USC, where he became the first freshman to win the Archie Griffin Award, and was selected third overall by the New York Jets in the 2018 NFL Draft. At age 21, he was the NFL's youngest opening-day starting quarterback since the AFL–NFL merger. Darnold served as the Jets' starter from 2018 to 2020 until he was traded to the Panthers in 2021.

Early life and education
Darnold was born in Dana Point, California on June 5, 1997. He started playing basketball when he was five years old.

High school
Darnold attended San Clemente High School in San Clemente, California. After playing baseball in his freshman year, he played football and basketball. During his high school basketball career, Darnold excelled, and was named South Coast League Most Valuable Player twice, along with being named to the all-CIF team. Basketball coach Marc Popovich stated Darnold's basketball skills helped translate into football, being the "only guy [I've] ever had who could get a defensive rebound and launch a 70-foot pass on target, pretty much in the same motion, to a guy breaking out in the fastbreak. It was almost Wes Unseld-like." Popovich added that Darnold could have played college basketball in the Pac-12 Conference or the Mountain West Conference "at worst."

On the football team, Darnold played wide receiver and linebacker, though he played quarterback as a sophomore after the starting quarterback was injured in a game against Tesoro High School. He threw a touchdown pass and scored the game-winning two-point conversion, but returned to playing receiver and linebacker a week later. When he legitimately became the school's quarterback, Darnold broke the school record for the most touchdown passes in a game when he threw five on two occasions. He missed much of his junior year with a foot injury. In his senior year, San Clemente reached the CIF-Southern Section Southwest Division championship game, where they lost 37–44 to Trabuco Hills High School in a comeback upset after Sam was knocked out of the game with a concussion. He ended his senior season with 3,000 passing yards and 39 touchdowns, along with 800 rushing yards and 13 rushing touchdowns.

Darnold was rated by Rivals.com as a four-star recruit and was ranked as the eighth best dual-threat quarterback in his class and 179th best player overall. However, he did not have much footage of him performing at recruiting camps, preferring to show his play in games. As a result, San Clemente head football coach Jaime Ortiz elected to provide video of his basketball career to football coaches. He received scholarship offers to play college football from schools like Oregon, Utah, Northwestern and Duke. During a football camp, USC coaches Clay Helton and Steve Sarkisian were impressed by Darnold's performance, and extended to him a scholarship to play for the Trojans.

College career

2015 season
USC defensive coordinator Justin Wilcox, who recruited Darnold to the school, wanted him to play linebacker before he declined. In the 2015 season, Darnold redshirted for his freshman year as he was behind Cody Kessler and Max Browne on the depth chart.

2016 season
Entering the 2016 season as a redshirt freshman, Darnold was the second-string quarterback behind Max Browne. In three games as backup quarterback, Darnold saw limited action, completing 14-of-22 passes for two touchdowns and an interception. After a 1–2 start to the season, Browne was benched in favor of Darnold. In his first career start with USC against the Utah Utes, Darnold completed 18-of-26 passes for 253 yards and recorded a rushing touchdown as USC lost 27–31. After the loss, Darnold's Trojans did not lose a game for the remainder of the season, including a 26–13 upset win over the #4-ranked Washington Huskies. The USC offense recorded an average of 37 points and 518 yards per game, while Darnold set the school record for most passing touchdowns by a freshman with 26, ten more than the previous record set by Todd Marinovich in 1989. Against Arizona and California, Darnold became the first quarterback in school history to record five touchdown passes in consecutive games, while also throwing for multiple touchdowns in eight straight games, the first USC quarterback to do so since Matt Leinart did in 2004. On the ground, Darnold recorded 230 rushing yards, the most by a USC quarterback since Reggie Perry's 254 yards in 1991. Darnold was named the 2016 Pac-12 Conference Freshman Offensive Player of the Year in late November.

USC was invited to play in the 2017 Rose Bowl, their first appearance in the bowl in eight seasons. In the 52–49 victory over Penn State, Darnold completed 33-of-53 passes for 453 yards, while also setting Rose Bowl records in passing touchdowns (5) and total yards (453). The 453 yards recorded ranked second in the bowl's history, only trailing Danny O'Neil's 456 in the 1995 game.

On January 4, 2017, it was announced that Darnold was awarded the Archie Griffin Award, which was awarded annually to college football's most valuable player to his team throughout the season, an award no other freshman had ever won previously. Darnold was also named to the Football Writers Association of America's Freshman All-America team.

2017 season
Entering the 2017 season as a redshirt sophomore, Darnold became an early favorite for the Heisman Trophy, and eventually a first-round pick in the 2018 draft. The season did not start the way Darnold had expected. In six games, he had matched the number of interceptions that he had thrown the previous year. This was accredited to breaking in a new receiver group, numerous injuries, and questionable coaching decisions. Despite this, he led USC to a dominant victory over Stanford by a score of 42–24. He then led an overtime victory over the Texas Longhorns during which he drove the Trojans to a game-tying field goal in the final 39 seconds of regulation. Darnold guided USC to the Pac-12 Conference championship with a 31–28 victory over Stanford in the conference title game where he was named the game's MVP after throwing for over 300 yards and two touchdowns. The win earned USC a spot in the 2017 Cotton Bowl where, despite having 356 passing yards, the Trojans were defeated by the Ohio State Buckeyes, 24–7.

Statistics

Professional career
On January 3, 2018, Darnold announced that he would enter the 2018 NFL Draft.

New York Jets 

Darnold was selected by the New York Jets in the first round, with the third overall selection, of the 2018 NFL Draft. On July 30, 2018, Darnold signed a four-year deal worth $30.25 million fully guaranteed featuring a $20 million signing bonus with the Jets.

2018 season 
Darnold made his professional debut on August 10, in the first preseason game against the Atlanta Falcons, where he finished with 96 passing yards and a touchdown as the Jets won 17–0. On August 29, the Jets named Darnold the starter for Week 1 of the season.

Darnold played his first regular season game on September 10, 2018, during Monday Night Football against the Detroit Lions, making him the youngest opening-day starting quarterback since the AFL–NFL merger. His first pass resulted in an interception returned for a touchdown by Quandre Diggs. However, he responded well and finished with 198 passing yards and two touchdowns as the Jets won 48–17. During the Jets' home opener against the Miami Dolphins in Week 2, Darnold finished with 334 passing yards, a touchdown, and two interceptions as the Jets lost 20–12. During a Thursday Night Football game against the Cleveland Browns in Week 3, Darnold finished with 169 passing yards and two interceptions as the Jets lost 21–17. During Week 4 against the Jacksonville Jaguars, Darnold finished with 167 passing yards and a touchdown as the Jets lost 31–12. During Week 5 against the Denver Broncos, Darnold finished with 198 passing yards, three touchdowns, and an interception, while the Jets combined for 323 rushing yards and won 34–16. During Week 6 against the Indianapolis Colts, Darnold finished with 280 passing yards, two touchdowns, and an interception as the Jets won 42–34. During Week 7 against the Minnesota Vikings, Darnold committed 4 turnovers, including 3 interceptions and a lost fumble. He finished with 206 passing yards and a touchdown as the Jets lost 37–17. During Week 8 against the Chicago Bears, Darnold finished with 153 passing yards and a touchdown as the Jets lost 24–10.

During a rematch against the Dolphins in Week 9, Darnold threw four interceptions, finishing the game with 229 passing yards in a 13–6 Jets' loss. Darnold suffered through a foot injury, which sidelined him and caused Josh McCown to start for the Jets. After missing three games due to a foot injury, Darnold returned to action in a Week 14 matchup against the Buffalo Bills and fellow rookie quarterback Josh Allen. Darnold temporarily left the game due to an injury on the same foot, but eventually returned, finishing with 170 passing yards, a touchdown, and an interception as the Jets ended their six-game losing streak and won 27–23. He led the team on its game-winning drive, completing a 37-yard pass to Robby Anderson to help set up a touchdown run by Elijah McGuire. During Saturday Night Football against the Houston Texans in Week 15, Darnold finished with 253 passing yards and two touchdowns as the Jets lost 29–22. During Week 16 against the Green Bay Packers, Darnold finished with 341 passing yards and three touchdowns. Marred by 16 penalties, the Jets squandered a 15-point lead and lost 44–38 in overtime. During Week 17 against the New England Patriots, Darnold finished with 167 passing yards as the Jets lost 38–3 in the regular-season finale. Darnold finished the season with 2,865 passing yards, 17 passing touchdowns, and 15 interceptions.

2019 season 

During the Jets' home opener against the Buffalo Bills in Week 1, Darnold finished with 179 passing yards and a touchdown. Despite the Jets having a 16–0 lead midway through the third quarter and four takeaways, the team lost 16–17. On September 12, it was reported that Darnold was diagnosed with mononucleosis, and he subsequently missed three games. He returned in Week 6 against the Dallas Cowboys where he finished with 338 passing yards, two touchdowns, and an interception as the Jets won 24–22. In the game, Darnold threw a 92-yard touchdown pass to Robby Anderson. He was named the AFC Offensive Player of the Week for his performance. During Monday Night Football against the New England Patriots in Week 7, the Jets only had 154 total yards of offense with Darnold throwing four interceptions and losing a fumble as the Jets were shut out 33–0. A sound bite captured by NFL Films and ESPN showed Darnold, who was mic'd up, commenting that he was "seeing ghosts" while struggling during the game, which led to mockery by opposing NFL fanbases.

During Week 8 against the Jacksonville Jaguars, Darnold finished with 218 passing yards, two touchdowns, and three interceptions as the Jets lost 29–15. During Week 9 against the Miami Dolphins, Darnold finished with 260 passing yards, a touchdown, and an interception as the Jets lost 26–18. During Week 10 against the New York Giants, Darnold finished with 230 passing yards, 25 rushing yards, and two total touchdowns as the Jets won 34–27. During Week 11 against the Washington Redskins, Darnold finished with 293 passing yards, four touchdowns, and an interception as the Jets won 34–17. During Week 12 against the Oakland Raiders, Darnold finished with 315 passing yards and two touchdowns as the Jets won 34–3. In Week 13, Darnold finished with 239 passing yards, but penalties by the offensive line proved to be costly as the Jets lost 22–6 to the Cincinnati Bengals. During a Dolphins' rematch in Week 14, Darnold finished with 270 passing yards, two touchdowns, and an interception as the Jets won 22–21. Darnold finished the 2019 season with 3,024 passing yards, 19 touchdowns, and 13 interceptions and had 33 carries for 62 rushing yards and two rushing touchdowns.

2020 season 
During the season opener against the Buffalo Bills in Week 1, Darnold finished with 215 passing yards, a touchdown, and an interception as the Jets lost 27–17. During the Jets' home opener against the San Francisco 49ers in Week 2, Darnold finished with 179 passing yards and a touchdown as the Jets lost 31–13. During Week 3 against the Indianapolis Colts, Darnold finished with 168 passing yards, a touchdown, and three interceptions, two of which were returned for a touchdown. He was sacked in the endzone for a safety as the Jets lost 36–7. During Thursday Night Football against the Denver Broncos in Week 4, Darnold finished with 230 passing yards, 86 rushing yards, and highlighted a big play with a 46-yard rushing touchdown. He briefly left the game with a shoulder injury after a sack but was allowed back in the game. Still, the Jets lost 37–28. After missing two games due to shoulder soreness, Darnold returned in Week 7 against the Bills, finishing with 120 passing yards and two interceptions as the Jets lost 18–10.
In Week 8 against the Kansas City Chiefs, Darnold reaggravated his shoulder injury and missed the Jets' next two games.  He made his return in Week 12 against the Miami Dolphins.  During the game, Darnold continued to struggle, throwing for 197 yards and two interceptions in the 20–3 loss.
In Week 13 against the Las Vegas Raiders, Darnold threw for 186 yards, two touchdowns, and one interception and also recorded a rushing touchdown during the 31–28 loss.  This was Darnold’s first game of the season in which he threw more touchdown passes than interceptions. Darnold finished the season with 2,208 passing yards, nine touchdowns, and 11 interceptions to go along with 217 rushing yards and two rushing touchdowns in 12 games as the Jets finished 2–14.

Carolina Panthers 
On April 5, 2021, Darnold was traded to the Carolina Panthers in exchange for a 2021 sixth-round pick and second- and fourth-round picks in 2022. On April 30, 2021, the team exercised the fifth-year option on Darnold's contract, worth a guaranteed $18.858 million for the 2022 season.

2021 season
Darnold made his first start for the Panthers on September 12, 2021, facing his former team, the New York Jets. During the game, he threw for 279 passing yards and a touchdown, as well as adding a five-yard rushing touchdown, as they won 19–14. Against the New Orleans Saints, Darnold threw for 305 yards, two touchdowns, and an interception, as the Panthers won 26–7. Against the Houston Texans, Darnold threw for 304 yards and rushed for two touchdowns as the Panthers won 24–9. Darnold suffered a fractured scapula during the Panthers 6–24 loss against the New England Patriots which made him miss four to six weeks with a shoulder injury. He was placed on injured reserve on November 12, 2021. He was activated on December 25. Darnold would go on to replace a struggling Cam Newton in the second quarter of a Week 16 game against the division rival Tampa Bay Buccaneers. He completed 15 of 32 passes for 190 yards as the Panthers went on to lose 32-6. It was the team's tenth loss in 12 games. In the 2021 season, Darnold finished with 2,527 passing yards, nine passing touchdowns, and 13 interceptions to go along with 48 carries for 222 rushing yards and five rushing touchdowns.

2022 season
Darnold was named the backup for the 2022 season after losing a preseason competition to new acquisition and 2018 draftmate Baker Mayfield. During the third preseason game against the Bills, Darnold left the game with an ankle injury. It turned out to be a high ankle sprain, requiring 4-6 weeks to recover. On September 1, 2022, Darnold was placed on injured reserve. On November 7, Darnold was activated back to the roster by the Panthers. Darnold was named the starter for the Panthers' Week 12 game against the Denver Broncos.

San Francisco 49ers
On March 16, 2023, Darnold signed a one-year contract the San Francisco 49ers.

Playing style
Though not regarded widely as a dual-threat quarterback, Darnold has been praised for his mobility in the pocket, which, when needed, allows him to escape pressure, extend plays and throw on the run. He has also been described as a "gunslinger".

NFL career statistics

Highlights and awards
 AFC Offensive Player of the Week (Week 6, 2019)

NFL records
 Youngest quarterback to post a passer rating higher than 110 – 116.8 rating at 21 years, 97 days old

Jets franchise records
 Highest completion percentage by a rookie quarterback in a single season (2018) – 57.7
 Highest rookie quarterback rating, minimum seven appearances – 77.6

Personal life
Darnold's mother is a physical education teacher at Shorecliffs Middle School. His older sister Franki played college volleyball at the University of Rhode Island. His grandfather Dick Hammer was a Marlboro Man actor and USC athlete.

Darnold's friends include fellow quarterbacks Josh Allen and Kyle Allen, both of the Buffalo Bills, and the three often train together in the offseason. 

Despite his lack of major success in the NFL, some NFL fans have referred to Darnold as GEQBUS (God Emperor Quarterback of the United States), which directly mocks the official designation of POTUS (President of the United States).

References

External links

 
 Carolina Panthers bio
 USC Trojans bio

1997 births
Living people
American football quarterbacks
Carolina Panthers players
New York Jets players
People from Dana Point, California
Players of American football from California
Sportspeople from Orange County, California
USC Trojans football players
San Francisco 49ers players